Hynek Martinec (born 12 November 1980 in Broumov) is a Czech-British painter, who graduated from the Studio of Classical Painting Techniques under the supervision of Prof. Zdeněk Beran at the Academy of Fine Arts, Prague. After his studies he left for Paris (2005-2007) and since 2007 has been living in London. He received the prestigious BP Young Artist Award (2007) for his hyperrealistic portraits. His paintings are inspired by Old Masters and/or photographs, which link the past with the future, using modern technologies.

Life 
In his hometown of Broumov and its surroundings Hynek Martinec was able to absorb the architecture of Dientzenhofer together with Czech Baroque painting. Since his childhood he drew extensively and already when he was 8–9 years old he discovered the world of classical music. As an 11-year-old boy, in 1991, he was successful in an art competition in Náchod and one painter of the jury offered him private classes and a thorough training in realistic painting. A year later he was taking classes from another painter, who exposed him to the world of abstract art.

After finishing primary school Martinec studied design at Uherské Hradiště for one year and then transferred to the Secondary Art School of Václav Hollar in Prague. Between 1999 and 2005 he studied at the Academy of Fine Arts, Prague at the Studio of Classical Painting Techniques under the supervision of Prof. Zdeněk Beran. During his studies he spent an exchange year at Middlesex University, London (2002) and a six-month exchange at the Cooper Union in New York (2004). In 2003, he received a studio award from the Academy of Fine Arts and in 2004 he was awarded as the best Academy student.

Following graduation he spent two years in Paris in a rented studio before deciding to move to London after receiving the Young Artist Award for artists under 30 in 2007, and at the same time the BP Visitor Choice for his portrait of Zuzana in Paris Studio (2006-2007). The painting was chosen among 60 finalists from 1,870 applications. In 2008 he received the Changing Faces Prize organised by the National Portrait Gallery, London for the painting Bagram in New York (2004) and BP Visitor Choice at the Scottish National Portrait Gallery in Edinburgh.

Hynek Martinec lives and works in London and is represented by Parafin Gallery. His partner Zuzana Jungmanová heads the Czech School Without Borders with around 200 children from the Czech community in London.

Awards 
 1991 Art Competition, Náchod 
 2003 Studio Award of the Academy of Fine Arts in Prague 
 2007 BP Young Artist Award, BP Visitor Choice, National Portrait Gallery, London 
 2008 The Changing Faces Prize, Royal Society of Portrait Painters, London, BP Visitor Choice, Scottish National Portrait Gallery, Edinburgh

Work 
Works during his college days include still lifes, winter mountain landscapes and several portraits. Painted during his studies in New York his portrait called Begram in NY (2004) was later awarded The Changing Faces prize . His graduation project included five large-format genre paintings from the Motol Hospital.

When a friend offered him the use of his studio in Paris, Martinec focused primarily on the project Cabling (2005-2007) that he perceived as a way to scan the past. Paris inspired him to use more colours and abstract painting. At the same time, he created a hyperrealistic portrait of his partner Zuzana Jungmanová. Zuzana’s glasses mirror the whole studio space, even with a fragment of the Paris landscape behind the window. The painting thus represents a record of the painter’s life in this period. Martinec applied with the portrait Zuzana in Paris Studio (2006-2007) to the prestigious National Portrait Gallery, London, BP Portrait Award competition and received the first prize for artists under 30, a success which prompted his move to London.

In 2008, he created the project Lost in Time inspired by the brutalist architecture of the National Theatre and the colourful patterns projected on its façade. At the centre of the whole series are black and white brush drawings, dark atmosphere and subtle artificial colouring.

After three years in London, painting mostly city motifs, Hynek Martinec realised that he had exhausted the possibilities of hyperrealist painting and started missing its emotional aspect. He got in touch with his photographer friend, a connoisseur of old photographic techniques. And through the creation of ambrotypes and daguerreotypes of Zuzana, he consequently transferred to monochrome large-format painting (Zuzana 1848, 2012, 244 x 184 cm, Zuzana 1854, 2012, 255 x 184 cm), attempting a certain journey back in time. The photographic technique of the 19th century presented the topic of time from a different angle than the painted image. By simulating old photographic technical aspects these paintings are freed from the boundaries of hyperrealism and move towards imagination of an autonomous parallel world. For a certain period, Martinec left acrylic behind and started his series of monochrome oil paintings in the historicising tone of sepia brown, resembling old photographs and which he continues to today.

In the following years, Martinec focused mostly on still lifes with existential undertones (Every Minute Closer to Death, 2013). Smaller formats often feature a quenched candle as a classical symbol of immortality (It Is Hard to Remember, 2014). The white paraffin could refer to the name of a gallery representing Martinec in London, but as such, also has a special aesthetic quality. At the point where the still life depicts only a single object, the technical perfection of painting becomes a tool towards meditating about time (Sigrun’s Bread, 2015) and sometimes he explicitly challenges the viewer to do so (The Propeller, 2015). The still lifes of Martinec created with the grisaille technique show his technical perfection. The sophisticated compositions play with archetypical devotional images and the theme of vanitas (Whipping of a Baroque Horse, 2017).

As an abstract spatial model Martinec often uses shaving cream that, as an ephemeral form, represents an absolutely contemporary symbol of vanitas (Where Do You Wander, John, 2014). At times, the cream resembles Baroque stucco reliefs and bestows the work with hidden sexual undertone or on the contrary, isolated cold. An intense death cult standing at the core of the Catholic Baroque simultaneously bears a strong need to aestheticize death. “Ice-cold Baroque” of Martinec transforms the idea of the Baroque world and exposes death not in the figures of saints, but simply in perfect and finished forms. Some forms are executed as three-dimensional structures in the acrylic matter of jesmonite (Fantasy Meets Brutal Reality, 2018).

In 2014, he started to incorporate old photographs in oil paintings and with small details out of different context linked with the contemporary world (Flyover into the Different Time, 2014). Since 2015, a subtle colouring has been once again appearing in Martinec’ chiaroscuro still lifes (Sigrun’s Bread, 2015). The fascination with Old Masters is further intensified at his exhibition in 2015 in Prague. In this period, he created the painting El Greco is Watching (2016) that is a true black and white copy of El Greco’s Christ at the National Gallery in Prague. Other paintings are open combinations of art inspired by works such as the Baroque self-portrait by Anthony van Dyck with Magritte’s pipe (The Vision, 2016) and/or use allusions borrowed from different classical works to create new and unexpected combinations (Allegory of the Internet, 2017). The painter experiences the world he lives in, but the political events directly influencing his life are commented on with alternative and hidden symbols (Brussels, 2016; Brexit, 2016).
 
The paintings by Martinec are preceded by an associative idea sourcing inspiration from literature or reflection of personal experiences linked to another artwork. References in titles of works are usually associated with philosophy, that of Nietzsche and Wittgenstein in particular, and topics of discussions with his brother (The Birth of Tragedies, 2018). Religious symbols have accompanied him since his youth spent at Broumov in an environment strongly shaped by the Baroque architecture of K. I. Dientzenhofer and they have remained a permanent part of his everyday life. In his works Martinec continues in a traditional European painting style, but presents it in a contemporary context turning towards the viewer today. He uses codes and symbols connecting the past with the present. Some autobiographical details penetrate his paintings in seemingly unrelated connections. One such symbol is a skull he caught a glimpse of as a child in a small village school he visited in Machov (Speak the Truth Even When Your Voice Shakes, 2013). At other times, the painting background reveals a panorama of a city where he spent the first six years of his life (Six Years of Tabula Rasa, 2013–14).

Martinec grew up in the 90s, a period of transformation thanks to computers and new media. His generation perceives the omnipresence of modern technologies with existential seriousness as a paradigm shift and attempts to react (Every Generation Has Its Own Revolution, 2014) or use it creatively in their work. Using 3D programmes on his computer Martinec creates paintings that serve more as models for immaterial sculpture. His motivation for a painting might be a drawing record of a dream, mixing saved images with an everyday reality, screening events hidden under the surface and creating surprising connections. A series of drawings after the Old Masters present Martinec with a tool to pull down the borders of time and link his work with artists he started to favour during his gallery visits. These motifs were consequently used in surreal Mannerist and/or Neo-Baroque compositions arbitrarily linking Old Masters references with elements of the contemporary world (Whirl of Nightmares, 2017). Instead of drafts he uses digital photographs of real objects that can be freely manipulated. Before he transfers it to canvas, the painting composition is created as an artificial reality through crossfading and dynamic distortion in Photoshop. 

As part of fictional travelling in time Martinec made a journey to Iceland in 2016 and recorded his performance in a series of photographs. In his borrowed identity of the Baroque architect Kilian Ignaz Dientzenhofer searching for a place to build his futuristic church, Martinec created a story, which he later used as his motto for the Prague exhibition Voyage to Iceland in 2018. One year earlier he visited Iceland to paint the landscape (Idea of a Landscape, Reykjavík, 2015) and put a painting of a meditating Buddha under the open sky. A similar intervention in nature was done with the monochrome painting of Christ’s head after El Greco’s image from the National Gallery in Prague, which he placed in 2017 in Andalusia, Spain.

Projects 
 2005 Motol (Prague) – large project focused on the relationship of man to the public space of the Motol Hospital, five large-scale paintings, video installation (thesis at the Academy of Fine Arts; project was realised in Prague and is part of the collection of the National Gallery Prague).
 2007 Cabling (Paris) – the whole project was understood as a meditative approach to capture energies and the past. In an imaginary space-time, Martinec used the effect of colourful strokes, lines typically characterised by focused blurred traces, Cabling works in its imaginary space-time. 
 2008 Lost in Time (London) – follow up of the Cabling project. The images reference masters of classical and contemporary painting with overlaps of current motifs. 
 2009 At The Same Time (London) – the paintings depict contemporary city scenes, empty spaces without people (supermarket, parking place, airports). The artist attempts to capture the cold industrial life in metropoles (London, Istanbul) and express solitude with hyperrealism exceeding to abstract geometrical shapes. 
 2012 Five Masters, Three Wardens and the Clerk (City of London) - polyptych of the officers of the Worshipful Company of Information Technologists commissioned by the Master Ken Olisa OBE
 2017 El Greco is Watching, (long-term project), Spain
 2018 Voyage to Iceland (London)
 2018 Art Brussels, solo project, Parafin, Brussels
 2019 The Everyday Archive, Brixton Beneficiary, London

Permanent Collections 
 British Museum, London
 National Gallery in Prague
 Sammlung FIEDE, Aschaffenburg
 Standard Chartered Bank, London
 WCIT Collection, London
 Asante Art Collection, Basel
 Robert Runtak Collection, Olomouc
 Omer Koc Collection, Istanbul
 Private collections in Vienna, Miami and New York

Solo shows 
 2000 Obrazy [Paintings], Ungula, antiquarian bookstore (Galerie Ungula), Prague
 2005/2006 Zmizel [Lost], Galerie DO/OKA, Prague
 2007 Czech Centre Gallery, Paris
 2008 Lost in Time, Cosa Gallery, London
 2009 At The Same Time, Cosa Gallery, London
 2009 After Holiday 1986, Czech Centre Gallery, Sofia
 2010 Lucky Man, Caroline Wiseman, London
 2013 Every Minute You Are Closer To Death, Flowers Gallery, London
 2014 Every Minute You Are Closer To Death, Parafin, London 
 2016 Hybrid, The Factory, London
 2016 Thank You For Looking at Me, Iceland
 2017 The Birth of Tragedies, Parafin Gallery, London
 2018 El Greco is Watching, Spain
 2018 Voyage to Iceland, Sternberg Palace, National Gallery Prague
 2018 Kilian Ignaz D., Galerie Dům, Broumov
 2019 The Everyday Archive, Brixton Beneficiary, London
 2020 The Same for Everyone, Parafin Gallery, London

Group shows (selection) 
 1999/2000 Artist Autumn in Náchod. 16th edition of regional art display, Gallery of Fine Art in Náchod 
 2001 AVU Studios / School of Painting of professor Zdeněk Beran, Wortner House of Aleš Southbohemian Gallery, České Budějovice 
 2004 Cooper Union Gallery, New York 
 2005 Nudes in Action / Graduate Exhibition of the Studio of Classical Painting of prof. Zdeněk Beran, Šumava Museum, Kašperk Mountains, Galerie Diamant, Prague 
 2005 AVU Graduates 2005, Trade Fair Palace, Prague 
 2005 Prague Biennale, National Gallery Prague 
 2005 Gallery Foundation M + J Anderle, Prague 
 2005 Prague’s Studios, New Town Hall Gallery, Prague 
 2006 Still Lifes, Gallery of Modern Art in Hradec Králové 
 2006 BLACK Art Festival, Pardubice 
 2007 BP Portrait Award, National Portrait Gallery, London, Tyne & Wear Museums, Newcastle 
 2007 Members Exhibition of Mánes Association of Fine Artists L-O, Galerie Diamant, Prague 
 2007/2008 Collective Exhibition: 2008 Calendar, Galerie DO/OKA, Prague 
 2008 Defenestration: Graduate and Student Exhibition of AVU, Studio of prof. Zdeněk Beran, New Town Hall Gallery, Prague 
 2008 Transfer, White Box, Munich 
 2008 International Triennale of Contemporary Art, National Gallery Prague 
 2008 Re-Reading The Future, Project Mobility, National Gallery Prague 
 2009 Transfer, House of the Lords of Kunštát, Brno 
 2009 Prague Biennale 4 / Prague Biennale Photo 1, Karlín Hall, Prague 
 2009 BP Portrait Award, National Portrait Gallery, London, Southampton City Art Gallery, Southampton 
 2010 BP Portrait Award, Scottish National Gallery, Edinburgh 
 2010 Passion for Freedom, UNIT 24 Gallery, London 
 2010 Transfer, Czech National Building, New York 
 2011 Encoded Systems, Read Gate Gallery, London 
 2012 Beyond Reality: British Painting Today, Galerie Rudolfinum, Prague 
 2012 Ein Weisses Feld, Schlachthaus Aschaffenburg 
 2012 Coal and Steel, Candid Arts Trust Gallery, London, Czech Centre Gallery, Prague 
 2013 BP Portrait Award, National Portrait Gallery, London 
 2014 John Moores Painting Prize 2014 at the Walker Art Gallery, Liverpool, as part of the Liverpool Biennial 
 2015 Blow Up: Painting, Photography and Reality, Parafin, London
 2016 YIA # 7 (Young International Artists) Paris, represented by ZAHORIAN & VAN ESPEN 
 2017 Arc of Memory, Zahorian & Van Espen, Prague 
 2017 Fascination with Reality: Hyperrealism in Czech Painting, Museum of Art Olomouc 
 2019 Vanité, Brixton Beneficiary, London 
 2019 In Living Memory, Emo Court in collaboration with OPW (Oliver Sears Gallery), Republic of Ireland
 2020 The Same For Everyone, Parafin, London
 2020 Inspiration - Iconic Works, Nationalmuseum Stockholm
 2020 Inspiration - Iconic Works, Ateneum Art Museum, Finish National Gallery, Helsinki
 2020 COMPLEX STATES: Art in the years of Brexit, Gallery 46, London, International and virtual exhibition, Worldwide     
 2020/2021 Vanitas, Dox Centre for Contemporary Art, Prague

References

Further reading 
 Otto M. Urban (ed.), Voyage to Iceland, National Gallery Prague 2018, 
 B. Kundračíková (ed.), Fascination with Reality: Hyperrealism in Czech Painting, Muzeum umění Olomouc, r. 2017, 
 500 Portraits: BP Portrait Award, 320 pages, National Portrait Gallery Co. Ltd., London 2011, 
 Ben Tufnell, Intellectual Properties, Gallery of Václav Špála, Praha 2015
 Ben Tufnell, Every Minute You Are Closer To Death, Parafin, London, 2014
 Milena Slavická, Petr Nedoma, Beyond Reality. British Painting Today, 128 s., Rudolfinum Gallery, Praha 2012, 
 Barbora Klímová, Beyond Reality Hynka Martince, Art Banking Bulletin 3, 2012, s. 15-17
 Prague Biennale 4, Giancarlo Politi Editore, Milan, 2009
 RE-READING THE FUTURE, Mobility, National Gallery, Prague, 2008 Hynek Martinec Paintings 1999-2008, Czech Centre, London, 2008

External links 

 Website of Hynek Martinec
 Parafin Gallery: Hynek Martinec 
 Hynek Martinec in conversation with curator Gita Joshi, 2020 
 Hynek Martinec: Every Minute You Are Closer To Death, Parafin, 2014 Vimeo

Czech painters
Living people
1980 births
People from Broumov